King Lot , also spelled Loth or Lott (Lleu or Llew in Welsh), is a British monarch in Arthurian legend. He was introduced in Geoffrey of Monmouth's influential chronicle Historia Regum Britanniae that portrayed him as King Arthur's brother-in-law and under-king, who serves as regent of Britain during the time between the reigns of Uther and Arthur. In the wake of Geoffrey, Lot has appeared regularly in the works of chivalric romance, alternating between the roles of Arthur's enemy and ally. He chiefly figures as ruler of the northern realm of Lothian and sometimes Norway; in other texts he rules Great Britain's northernmost Orkney isles. He is generally depicted as the husband of Arthur's sister or half-sister, often known as Anna or Morgause. The names and number of their children vary depending on the source, but the later romance tradition has given him the sons Gawain, Agravain, Gaheris, Gareth, and Mordred. Lot's literary character is likely connected to the hagiographical material concerning Saint Kentigern, which feature Leudonus as king of Leudonia (the Latin name for Lothian) and father of Saint Teneu.

Origins
A king of Lothian named Leudonus (Leudon) of Leudonia can be found in both Latin and Welsh sources. An early (dating from the late first millennium) fragmentary Vita Kentigerni features the maternal grandfather of Saint Kentigern, also known as Saint Mungo. In this text, Leudonus becomes enraged when he discovers that his daughter Teneu had been raped and impregnated by Owain mab Urien and has her thrown from a cliff. However, she survives the ordeal with divine protection and goes to Saint Serf's community, where she gives birth to Kentigern. Welsh sources call him Lewdwn or Llewdwn Lluydauc ("L[l]ewdwn of the Host"') and make him king of the Gododdin in the Brittonic Hen Ogledd (Old North). The story of Urien, Owein and Kentigern refers to events among the Men of the North that took place up to a century after the timeframe generally associated with Arthur.

Geoffrey of Monmouth seems to recall this earlier figure in the king whom he called Lot or Loth in the early 12th-century Historia Regum Britanniae. His sources are obscure, but his choice of name is probably based on its similarity to "Lodonesia", a typical Latinized name for Lothian. This toponymical connection parallels Geoffrey's association of King Leir with Leicester and Coel with Colchester, and William of Malmesbury's assertion that Walwen (Gawain) was king of Galloway. In the Middle Ages, no principle of historiography was more solidly established than the idea that places took their names from persons. An explicit connection between Leudonus and Geoffrey's Lot was later made in John Major's Historia Majoris Brittaniae (1521), which named the mother of Kentigern as Thametes, daughter of Lot and sister of Gawain.

The post-Geoffrey Welsh Llew ap Cynfarch (Lleu son of Cynfarch) shares his name with the figure Llew Llaw Gyffes, likely a euhemerized deity known from the Four Branches of the Mabinogi, though the extent of this connection is conjectural. Lot was also identified with the Welsh mythology hero Lludd Llaw Eraint.

The name Lot may be connected to the Norse name Ljot, appearing in the Norse sagas and having been known in Orkney. The Old Norwegian Ljot, pronounced "lee-iot" or "iot", was a common name in the old Galte clan who ruled the Orkneys and parts of Scotland before the Sinclairs. In Hardanger, the Lothe family, in close kinship with the old Galte clan, did use a raven banner. They still own their original family farm at Lothe in Utne, the location of Norway's largest tree. The name may also be linked to the Highland Scottish standing stone called the Stone Lud.

Arthuriana
Geoffrey's Lot is one of three brothers, each of whom rules a part of northern Britain: Lot rules Lodonesia and is the lord of Carlisle, while his brothers Urien (the father of Owain, both generally reckoned historical kings of Rheged) and Angusel rule over Mureif (Moray) and "Scotland", respectively. Lot is first mentioned as a loyal vassal to Uther Pendragon, High King of Britain, in the wars against Octa, the Saxon king of Kent. When Uther falls ill, he marries his daughter Anna to Lot and entrusts them with the oversight of the kingdom. Lot and Anna have sons Gawain and Mordred. When Uther's son Arthur takes up the kingship, he helps Lot and his brothers regain their territories, which have fallen to the Saxons. Lot is also the heir to the "Kingdom of Norway", as nephew to the previous king Sichelm. With Arthur's aid, he takes the kingdom from the usurper Riculf. Lot later leads one of Arthur's armies in his war against Emperor Lucius of Rome.

In the wake of Geoffrey, Lot entered into Welsh Arthurian tradition as Lleu/Llew. The Welsh Triads maintain Geoffrey's association between Lot and Urien as brothers, drawing Lot into the historical Urien's genealogical tradition as a son of Cynfarch and Nefyn, daughter of Brychan Brycheiniog. His wife in the Welsh literature is Arthur's sister Gwyar, mother of Gwalchmei (Gawain). 

Early Arthurian romances, such as those of Chrétien de Troyes, often refer to Lot, but he rarely receives more than a mention in connection to his famous son Gawain. Yvain, the hero of Chrétien's Yvain, the Knight of the Lion, has roots in Welsh sources as Owain son of Urien, the supposed father of Kentigern. An article by J. C. Lozac'hmeur identifies similarities between Chrétien's tale and that of Kentigern. In the romance, Owain travels from Carlisle to marry the lady of Landuc or the daughter of Duke Landuc; in one manuscript she is named as Laudine. It has been proposed that both of these names again derive from a form of "Lothian" and that Chrétien was drawing upon an unknown source that resembled the saint's legend and the Breton lai Desiré. De Ortu Waluuanii and Les Enfances Gauvain tell of how the teenage Lot fell in love with Uther Pendragon's young daughter Anna while serving as her page; this story takes place during the time when he was a royal hostage at the court of Uther after the first British conquest of Norway. German romances by Wolfram von Eschenbach and Der Pleier give Gawain brother Beacurs (Beatus) and several sisters including Cundrie (Gundrie), Itonje (Itoni), and Soredamor (Surdamur), born from Arthur's sister named Sangive or Seife.  Some works such as Sir Gawain and the Green Knight feature him as a member of Arthur's court. In the Alliterative Morte Arthure and the Didot Perceval, Lot dies in Arthur's final battle against Mordred.

Lot takes a more prominent role in the cyclical narratives of the early 13th century. Probably due to his earlier association with Norway, in these works he is king not only of Lothian, but Orkney as well. In the Lancelot-Grail (Vulgate) prose cycle, Lot of Orcania (Orkney) is son of Hedor (Hector), the king of Lothian a descendant of Joseph of Arimathea, and an unnamed daughter of the king of Norgales (North Wales, that is the kingdom of Gwynedd). After Uther weds Igraine, he marries her daughters from her first marriage off to his political allies. Her oldest daughter, appearing under different names in the romances but today best known as Morgause (Roger Sherman Loomis argued this name was a variant of Morgan), is married to King Lot. He and Morgause have five sons: Gawain, Agravain, Gaheris, and Gareth, as well as Mordred (whose biological father, however, is not Lot but Arthur from an incest with his sister). Later, when the young Arthur comes to power, Lot at first defies him and raises an army in rebellion along with his brothers and several other Brittonic kings. It is only after Arthur defeats the rebel coalition at Bedegraine and then helps them fend off the Saxons that Lot becomes Arthur's ally.

Following the Prose Tristan, the Post-Vulgate Cycle offered a different version of Lot's story. As in the Lancelot-Grail, Lot opposes Arthur until the defeat at Bedegraine. Afterwards, however, Arthur hears a prophecy that a child born on May Day is destined to destroy him. Arthur gathers up all babies born around that time, including his own bastard son Mordred, and puts them on a ship that then sinks, and the children are believed to have all perished. The incensed Lot, who believed Mordred to be one of his own sons, joins Arthur's enemy King Rience and resumes his campaign against Arthur until he is killed in a battle by the loyalist King Pellinore, his defeat enabled by Merlin's prior magical intervention. His death sparks a long blood feud between their families that leads to the revenge killings of Pellinore and most of his sons, as well as the murder of Lot's wife. This version of Lot's story was taken up by Thomas Malory for his seminal English complication Le Morte d'Arthur, in which Merlin notes Lot (originally Lote) of Orkney as Arthur's strongest early enemy that unfortunately must be slain on the day of their battle for Arthur to live. The subsequent disastrous Lot-Pellinore clan feud arguably constitutes one of the three main plot strands of Malory's work (alongside the sacred Grail Quest and the doomed love affair of Lancelot and Guinevere) and has subsequently appeared in a number of modern Arthurian works.

While Lot's realm is usually placed south of Hadrian's Wall (in the post-Roman Lothian), Scottish late-medieval chronicles, notably Hector Boece's Historia Gentis Scotorum, would cast him as both king of the Picts and a Pict himself. This association has carried on to some works of modern Arthuriana.

References

Bibliography

Sobecki, Sebastian I. [Ed.] (2007). The Scots and Medieval Arthurian Legend (Arthurian Studies No. 61). English Studies.

Arthurian characters
King Arthur's family
Knights of the Round Table
Legendary British kings
Lothian